Account (abbreviated a/c) may refer to:

 Account (bookkeeping)
 A report
 A bank account
 Deposit account
 Personal account
 Sweep account
 Transaction account
 User account, the means by which a user can access a computer system
 Customer of a company, used in B2B business. See account manager or account executive.